The 1818 United Kingdom general election saw the Whigs gain a few seats, but the Tories under the Earl of Liverpool retained a majority of around 90 seats. The Whigs were divided over their response to growing social unrest and the introduction of the Corn Laws.

The result of the election was known on 4 August 1818.

The fifth United Kingdom Parliament was dissolved on 10 June 1818. The new Parliament was summoned to meet on 4 August 1818, for a maximum seven-year term from that date. The maximum term could be and normally was curtailed, by the monarch dissolving the Parliament, before its term expired. The sixth Parliament lasted only about a year and a half, as King George III's death on 29 January 1820 triggered a dissolution of Parliament.

Political situation
The Tory leader was the Earl of Liverpool, who had been Prime Minister since his predecessor's assassination in 1812. The Tory Leader of the House of Commons was Robert Stewart, Viscount Castlereagh.

The Whig Party had long suffered from weak leadership, particularly in the House of Commons.

At the time of the general election, the Earl Grey was the leading figure amongst the Whig peers. The last Whig Prime Minister, the Lord Grenville, had retired from active politics in 1817. It was likely that Earl Grey would have been invited to form a government, had the Whigs come to power, although in this era the monarch rather than the governing party decided which individual would be Prime Minister.

The Leader of the Opposition in the House of Commons, until his death in 1817, was George Ponsonby, Lady Grey's uncle. About a year after Ponsonby's death, George Tierney reluctantly became the recognised Leader of the Opposition in the House of Commons. However, after 1819 he did not carry out the functions of leader although he retained the title.

Summary of the constituencies

Monmouthshire (1 County constituency with 2 MPs and one single member Borough constituency) is included in Wales in these tables. Sources for this period may include the county in England.

Table 1: Constituencies and MPs, by type and country

Table 2: Number of seats per constituency, by type and country

See also
 United Kingdom general elections

References

 His Majesty's Opposition 1714–1830, by Archibald S. Foord (Oxford University Press 1964)
(Dates of Elections) Footnote to Table 5.02 British Electoral Facts 1832–1999, compiled and edited by Colin Rallings and Michael Thrasher (Ashgate Publishing Ltd 2000).
(Types of constituencies – Great Britain) British Historical Facts 1760–1830, by Chris Cook and John Stevenson (The Macmillan Press 1980).
(Types of constituencies – Ireland) Parliamentary Election Results in Ireland 1801–1922, edited by B.M. Walker (Royal Irish Academy 1978).

1818 elections in the United Kingdom
General election
1818
August 1818 events
1810s elections in Ireland